Dhale is one of the Yemeni governorates that was created after the unification of Yemen. The  population of the province accounts for 2% of the total population of the republic. The governorate is divided into 9 districts. The city of Dhale is the administrative centre of the province. Dali is one of the governorates that is known for agriculture, and most of the population works in that industry. The most important agricultural crop is coffee. The province also contains mineral resources, most importantly talc, which is used in the manufacture of paper, paint, cosmetics and pesticides. This governorate is also home to the Damt hot-springs (Ḥamam-Damt), a popular tourist attraction. One of the ancient cities in the region is Juban, a city famous for its castle and the historic Mansuria school, built by the Tahrids. The climate in Dhale governorate is mostly temperate throughout the year.

History
Before the unification of Yemen in 1990, Dhale governorate consisted of nine districts, five in South Yemen and four in North Yemen. The South Yemeni districts, Al Hussein, Al Azariq, Ash Shu'ayb, Jahaf, and Ad Dhale'e, were all in the country's Lahij Governorate. The North Yemeni districts were Juban, part of Al Bayda Governorate, Al Husha, part of Taiz Governorate, and Damt District and Qa'atabah District, both part of Ibb Governorate. 70% of the area of today's Dhale Governorate was in North Yemen in 1989.

Geography

Dhale Governorate is 245 kilometers away from the Yemeni capital Sana'a.

Adjacent governorates

 Al Bayda Governorate (north)
 Ibb Governorate (west)
 Lahij Governorate (south)
 Taiz Governorate (southwest)

Districts
Dhale Governorate is divided into the following 9 districts. These districts are further divided into sub-districts, and then further subdivided into villages:

References

 
Governorates of Yemen